The Very Best of Frank Sinatra is a double disc compilation album by Frank Sinatra that consists 40 hits he made from Reprise Records.

Track listing

Disc one
 "Stardust" (Hoagy Carmichael, Mitchell Parish) - 2:48
 "A Foggy Day" (George Gershwin, Ira Gershwin) - 2:17
 "Let's Fall in Love" (Harold Arlen, Ted Koehler) - 2:11
 "The Girl Next Door" (Hugh Martin, Ralph Blane) - 3:18
 "Old Devil Moon" (Burton Lane, E.Y. Harburg) - 2:59
 "The Way You Look Tonight" (Dorothy Fields, Jerome Kern) - 3:22
 "Fly Me to the Moon (In Other Words)" (Bart Howard) - 2:30
 "Nice Work If You Can Get It" (G. Gershwin, I. Gershwin) - 2:37
 "I Get a Kick Out of You" (Cole Porter) - 3:14
 "Come Rain or Come Shine" (Arlen, Johnny Mercer) - 4:05
 "Please Be Kind" (Saul Chaplin, Sammy Cahn) - 2:43
 "Don'cha Go 'Way Mad" (Jimmy Mundy, Al Stillman, Illinois Jacquet) - 3:12
 "They Can't Take That Away from Me" (G. Gershwin, I. Gershwin) - 2:41
 "In the Wee Small Hours of the Morning" (David Mann, Bob Hilliard) - 2:43
 "I've Got You Under My Skin" (Porter) - 3:26
 "Let's Face the Music and Dance" (Irving Berlin) - 2:58
 "Come Fly with Me" (Cahn, Jimmy Van Heusen) - 3:11
 "My Kind of Town" (Cahn, Van Heusen) - 3:09
 "Luck Be a Lady" (Frank Loesser) - 5:17
 "The Best Is Yet to Come" (Cy Coleman, Carolyn Leigh) - 3:10

Disc two
 "It Was a Very Good Year" (Ervin Drake) - 4:25
 "All or Nothing at All" (Jack Lawrence, Arthur Altman) - 3:43
 "Night and Day" (Porter) - 3:37
 "Nancy (With the Laughing Face)" (Phil Silvers, Van Heusen) - 3:37
 "Young at Heart" (Leigh, Johnny Richards) - 2:54
 "Love and Marriage" (Cahn, Van Heusen) - 2:12
 "All the Way" (Cahn, Van Heusen) - 3:27
 "Witchcraft" (Coleman, Leigh) - 2:37
 "(Love Is) The Tender Trap" (Cahn, Van Heusen) - 2:37
 "The Second Time Around" (Cahn, Van Heusen) - 3:03
 "Pocketful of Miracles" (Cahn, Van Heusen) - 2:39
 "Softly, as I Leave You" (Hal Shaper, Antonio DeVito, Giorgio Calabrese) - 2:50
 "Strangers in the Night" (Bert Kaempfert, Charles Singleton (songwriter), Eddie Snyder) - 2:25
 "Summer Wind" (Heinz Meier, Hans Bradtke, Mercer) - 2:53
 "That's Life" (Kelly Gordon, Dean Kay) - 3:10
 "Somethin' Stupid" [with Nancy Sinatra] (Carson Parks) - 2:45
 "Wave" (Antonio Carlos Jobim) - 3:25
 "My Way" (Paul Anka, Claude Francois, Jacques Revaux, Gilles Thibaut) - 4:36
 "Theme from New York, New York" (Fred Ebb, John Kander) - 3:26
 "Put Your Dreams Away (For Another Day)" (Paul Mann, George David Weiss, Ruth Lowe) - 3:12

Personnel
 Frank Sinatra - vocals
 Nancy Sinatra - vocals
 Antonio Carlos Jobim - guitar
 Nelson Riddle - arranger, conductor
 Don Costa
 Gordon Jenkins
 Billy May
 Johnny Mandell
 Ernie Freeman
 Billy Strange
 Eumir Deodato
 Neal Hefti
 Count Basie and his orchestra

References

1997 greatest hits albums
Frank Sinatra compilation albums